The Ministry of Home Affairs is a ministry in Zambia. It is headed by the Minister of Home Affairs.

List of ministers

Deputy ministers

References

Home Affairs
 
Zambia